Trøe is a village in the municipality of Lillesand in Agder county, Norway. The village sits along the head of a bay that flows north from the Blindleia inland waterway.

References

Villages in Agder
Lillesand